Tunbridge may refer to the following places:

 Tunbridge, Illinois, United States
 Tunbridge, North Dakota, see Locations in the United States with an English name#North Dakota
 Tunbridge, Tasmania, Australia
 Tunbridge, Vermont, United States
 The old spelling of Tonbridge, Kent, England
 Tunbridge (UK Parliament constituency)
 Royal Tunbridge Wells, Kent, England

See also
 Tonbridge (disambiguation)